In Mandaeism, the World of Light or Lightworld is the primeval, transcendental world from which Tibil and the World of Darkness emerged.

Description
The Great Life (Hayyi Rabbi or Supreme God/Monad) is the ruler of the World of Light.
Countless uthras dwell in škinas in the World of Light. (A škina is a celestial dwelling where uthras, or benevolent celestial beings, live in the World of Light.)
The World of Light is the source of the Great Yardena (or Jordan River) of Life, also known as Piriawis.
Ether, which can be thought of as heavenly breath or energy, permeates the World of Light.
The Mshunia Kushta (Mšunia Kušṭa) is a part of the World of Light considered to be the dwelling place of heavenly or ideal counterparts (dmuta).
In some Mandaean texts, Tarwan is a part of the World of Light that is described as a "pure land."

Ascension
When a Mandaean person dies, priests perform elaborate death rituals or death masses called masiqta in order to help guide the soul (nišimta) towards the World of Light. In order to pass from Tibil (Earth) to the World of Light, the soul must go through multiple maṭarta (watch-stations, toll-stations or purgatories; see also Arcs of Descent and Ascent and Araf) before finally being reunited with the dmuta, the soul's heavenly counterpart.

Parallels
The idea has some parallels with the Gnostic concept of pleroma.

See also
Heaven
Divine light
Pleroma in Gnosticism
Form of the Good in Platonism
Nūr (Islam)
Ohr in Jewish mysticism
Tabor Light

References

Mandaean cosmology
Conceptions of heaven
Light and religion